Kwangju Broadcasting Corporation or kbc is a Radio and TV station in Gwangju, affiliated with the SBS Network.

Stations

 Television
Channel - Ch. 15 (LCN 6-1)
Launched - May 14, 1995
Affiliated to - SBS
Call Sign - HLDH-DTV
 FM radio (kbc MyFM)
Frequency - FM 101.1 MHz (Gwangju, Mokpo), 96.7 MHz (Yeosu), 104.3 MHz (Yeonggwang), 90.7 MHz (Gwangyang)
Launched - February 2, 1998
Affiliated to - SBS Power FM
Call Sign - HLDH-FM

See also
SBS (Korea)

External links
 

Seoul Broadcasting System affiliates
Television channels and stations established in 1995
Mass media in Gwangju